Resisting Enemy Interrogation is a 1944 United States Army docudrama training film, directed by Robert B. Sinclair and written by Harold Medford and Owen Crump. The cast includes Arthur Kennedy, Mel Tormé, Lloyd Nolan, Craig Stevens and Peter Van Eyck. Resisting Enemy Interrogation was intended to train United States Army Air Forces (USAAF) crews to resist interrogation by the Germans.

Resisting Enemy Interrogation received an Academy Award nomination in 1944 for best feature-length documentary.

Plot
In 1944, German intelligence strives to find the target of an upcoming raid by the reputed "B-99 bomber". To achieve this end, they interrogate a recently shot-down aircrew from a B-99 reconnaissance mission that was shot down over Italy. The aircrew is sent to Dulag Luft POW camp.

The German officers, commanded by Major von Behn (Carl Esmond) use various methods to discover this information, some of them quite subtle. While interviewing Lieutenant Frank L. Williams, Jr. (Don Porter) and Captain James Spencer (James Seay), the two airmen at first resist any probing for information. Other members of the crew include Sergeant Alfred Mason (Arthur Kennedy).

Though no physical brutality is used, the Germans at one point stage a mock execution to scare a prisoner. Another prisoner is subjected to isolation to heighten his fear. Red Cross officers and a nurse (Poldi Dur) use their positions to extract information from the prisoners. Each airman eventually provides useful information because of their arrogance, fear or naivety. Some of what they say, which the enemy finds useful, seems innocuous but is used by the Germans as pieces to solve the larger puzzle.

In the end, the Germans are able to determine the target of the raid and the B-99 bombing mission is intercepted. The intended target is spared heavy damage with 21 B-99s shot down and the loss of 105 aircrew.

The U.S. intelligence officer (Lloyd Nolan), in his briefing to the surviving members of the raid, stresses not talking under any circumstances because of the danger of talking too much; even innocuous conversation can help the enemy. He also says not to let down one's guard, that everything in a prison camp is suspect, and not to try to outwit the enemy.

Cast
In alphabetical order

 Louis Adlon as Major Franz Kohmer (uncredited)
 Rand Brooks as Pilot (uncredited)
 Frederic Brunn as German Yard Guard (uncredited)
 George Dolenz as Captain Volbricht (uncredited)
 Poldi Dur as Nazi Nurse (uncredited)
 Carl Esmond as Major von Behn - Nazi Commandant (uncredited)
 Steven Geray as Dr. Victor Münz - Camp Doctor (uncredited)
 Arthur Kennedy as Sergeant Alfred Mason (uncredited)
 Sam Locke as Nazi (uncredited)
 Lloyd Nolan as USAAF Debriefing Officer / Narrator (uncredited)
 George O'Hanlon as American Pilot at Headquarters (uncredited)
 Don Porter as Lieutenant Frank L. Williams, Jr. - American Co-pilot (uncredited)
 Otto Reichow as German Prison Guard (uncredited)
 Henry Rowland as German Sergeant Renser (uncredited)
 Hans Schumm as German Guard (uncredited)
 James Seay as Captain James N. Spencer (uncredited)
 Kent Smith as Captain Reining - American Working for the Nazis (uncredited)
 Craig Stevens as B-26 Pilot (uncredited)
 Charles Tannen as Sergeant Freulich - German Prison Plant (uncredited)
 Mel Tormé as Ralph Cole (uncredited)
 Peter van Eyck as Captain Granach - Young Nazi Officer (uncredited)
 Hans Heinrich von Twardowski as Herr Mahler - German Red Cross Representative (uncredited)
 Max Wilk as Nazi (uncredited)

Production
Principal photography for Resisting Enemy Interrogation took place at the Hal Roach Studios. Aside from brief voice-over narration at the beginning and a speech by Lloyd Nolan at the end, the film is presented in dramatic form. According to screenwriter Owen Crump from the First Motion Picture Unit, the secluded Bavarian chateau that appears in the film at the beginning was a process shot based on a picture post card. After the war, Crump said two aviators visited Warner Bros. studios. During the war, they were taken to the same chateau for interrogation. Recognizing it from Resisting Enemy Interrogation, the two fliers were so amused that they kept breaking into laughter, completely baffling their captors.

Stock footage of Douglas A-20 Havoc, Lockheed Hudson, Martin B-26 Marauder and North American B-25 Mitchell bombers were featured in the aerial combat sequence. The German aircraft were a combination of stock footage and models of the Messerschmitt Bf 109 fighters that made the interception.

Reception
Resisting Enemy Interrogation was typical of the propaganda films of the period produced under the auspices of the Office of War Information. The film was distributed and exhibited by the USAAF primarily to air force personnel but was released as a theatrical feature in New York in August 1944.

Remake
In 1950, the film story of Resisting Enemy Interrogation was purchased from Harold Medford to be made into a Universal-International motion picture with a working title of "Prisoner of War." The film, entitled Target Unknown, was released by Universal in 1951 with a screenplay by Medford. It was directed by George Sherman with a cast led by Mark Stevens. The climax of the film is changed to an escape of the prisoners.

References

Notes

Bibliography

 Koppes, Clayton R. and Gregory D. Black. Hollywood Goes to War: How Politics, Profits and Propaganda Shaped World War II Movies. New York, The Free Press, 1987. .

External links
 
 
 'Resisting Enemy Interrogation' at the Library of Congress
 
 Resisting Enemy Interrogation at the National Archives and Records Administration

Films about the United States Army Air Forces
1944 films
American documentary films
1940s war drama films
1940s English-language films
1940s German-language films
American black-and-white films
First Motion Picture Unit films
Articles containing video clips
1944 documentary films
American war drama films
1944 drama films
1940s multilingual films
American multilingual films
Films directed by Robert B. Sinclair
1940s American films